Paul Desmond is an album by saxophonist Paul Desmond recorded in 1975 at the Bourbon Street jazz club in Toronto and released on the Artists House label in 1978. The album's tracks were remixed and re-released in 2020 as part of the Mosaic Records boxed set The Complete 1975 Toronto Recordings.

Reception

Allmusic reviewer by Richard S. Ginell said "After Desmond's death in May 1977, bassist Don Thompson went through the rejected tapes of the live sessions he, Desmond, guitarist Ed Bickert, and drummer Jerry Fuller had made in Toronto for the album The Paul Desmond Quartet Live and came up with an extra LP of fresh material. The results came out not on A&M/Horizon but on producer John Snyder's tiny Artists House label, so this will be hard to find. But when you do find it, you'll hear Desmond in nearly peak form".

Track listing
 "Too Marvelous for Words" (Richard A. Whiting, Johnny Mercer) − 6:38
 "Audrey" (Dave Brubeck, Paul Desmond) − 9:26
 "Line For Lyons" (Gerry Mulligan) − 7:22
 "When Sunny Gets Blue" (Jack Segal, Marvin Fisher) − 11:36
 "Darn That Dream" (Jimmy Van Heusen, Eddie DeLange) − 10:43

Personnel
Paul Desmond − alto saxophone
Ed Bickert − guitar
Don Thompson − bass
Jerry Fuller − drums

References 

Artists House live albums
Paul Desmond live albums
1978 live albums